Grega Žemlja (born 29 September 1986) is a retired Slovenian tennis player. He has won five singles titles and one doubles title on the ATP Challenger Tour. In 2012, he reached the third round of the US Open, the first Slovenian male player ever to reach that stage in a Grand Slam tournament. He is also the first Slovenian ATP player who in 2013 reached third round at Wimbledon. He reached his highest ATP ranking of World No. 43 in singles in May 2013, becoming the first Slovene ATP player to reach the top 50. Žemlja also became the first Slovene player earning over 1 million US dollars in prize money, and he was the highest-paid Slovene player in history until he was passed by Blaž Kavčič. He represented his country as a member of Slovenia Davis Cup team.

Tennis career

2009 
2009 was Žemlja's first year at the main draw on the ATP Tour. For the first time in his career he qualified for the main draw of Wimbledon where he lost in first round against Albert Montañés. He was the second Slovenian male player ever to play in the main draw of the Grand Slam tournament.

2010 
For the first time in his career he qualified for the main draw of the Australian Open where he lost in first round against Benjamin Becker. He became the first ever Slovenian male player to play in the main draw of Australian Open.

Žemlja qualified for the 2010 French Open and scored a major upset over the #26 seed Juan Mónaco 7–6(8–6), 3–6, 7–5, 6–3, in his first ever Grand Slam victory. He became the first Slovenian male player to win a single match in the Grand Slam tournament. He also became the first Slovenian male player to perform in three different Grand Slam tournaments on three different surfaces.

For the first time in his career he participated in the ATP World Tour 500 series tournament at 2010 Legg Mason Tennis Classic in Washington, D.C. where he lost the second round match against Andy Roddick.

Together with Slovenia Davis Cup Team he won the 2010 Davis Cup Europe/Africa Zone Group II, ensuring Slovenia to advance to Europe/Africa Zone Group I.

2011 
For the second consecutive year, he qualified for the main draw of Australian Open where he lost the first round match against Marcos Baghdatis in five sets.

As a lucky loser, he also qualified for the 2011 Wimbledon Championships. He became the first Slovenian male player to win a single match in the main draw of Wimbledon, but lost his second round match against Gaël Monfils.

2012
He played at 2012 Qatar Open in Doha and lost 2–6, 3–6 against Roger Federer in second round.

He received a wild card to participate in the 2012 Wimbledon Championships, where he lost the second round match against Fernando Verdasco.

On August 6, 2012, he entered the top 100 of the ATP rankings.

For the first time in his career he qualified for the main draw of the US Open. Beating Ricardo Mello and Cedrik-Marcel Stebe in first two rounds, he became the first Slovenian male player ever to reach the third round of the Grand Slam tournament. In the third round he lost against Janko Tipsarević.

At 2012 Erste Bank Open tournament in Vienna, Austria, he reached his and Slovenian first male historic ATP Final, where he lost 5–7, 3–6 to Juan Martín del Potro. With that result he became the first Slovenian male tennis player to reach TOP 50 on ATP rankings.

2013
At 2013 Australian Open for the first time he directly entered Grand Slam tournament. He lost 6–7(6–8), 6–7(5–7), 0-1 retiring in 1st round against Marcel Granollers. He also played his first men's doubles Grand Slam tournament.

He played against Roger Federer for the second time in his career in Rotterdam at 2013 ABN AMRO World Tennis Tournament of ATP 500 series. He lost 3–6, 1–6 in 1st round.

For the first time in his career he played in main draw of ATP 1000 Masters series at 2013 Miami Masters. As a first Slovenian he reached 3R and lost 4–6, 4–6 against Gilles Simon.

At 2013 French Open he reached second round where he lost 1–6, 7–5, 1–6, 4–6 against Kei Nishikori. In men's doubles partnering Aljaž Bedene they lost 5–7, 1–6 against Aisam-ul-Haq Qureshi/Jean-Julien Rojer in 2nd round. This is the first historic win in 1st round of Grand Slam Slovenian men's doubles and first Slovene men's doubles performance in the French Open.

At 2013 Wimbledon Championships, he beat Michael Russell and 29th seed Grigor Dimitrov, becoming the first Slovene player in the third round of Wimbledon, where he lost in straight sets to Juan Martín del Potro. Partnering Aljaž Bedene in the first round of men's doubles they lost against Sanchai Ratiwatana and Sonchat Ratiwatana. This was the first Slovene men's doubles team at Wimbledon.

ATP career finals

Singles: 1 (1 runner-up)

ATP Challenger and ITF Futures finals

Singles: 38 (17–21)

Doubles: 14 (5–9)

Performance timeline

Singles

Davis Cup

Singles performances (18–10)

Doubles performances (11–8)

References

External links 

 Official website 
 
 
 

Slovenian male tennis players
Living people
1986 births
Sportspeople from Jesenice, Jesenice
Sportspeople from Kranj
Mediterranean Games bronze medalists for Slovenia
Mediterranean Games medalists in tennis
Competitors at the 2005 Mediterranean Games